Naan Mahaan Alla  is a 1984 Indian Tamil-language action film directed by S. P. Muthuraman. The film stars Rajinikanth, Radha and M. N. Nambiar. It is a remake of the Hindi film Vishwanath (1978). The film was released on 14 January 1984, Pongal day and emerged a commercial success.

Plot 

Viswanath, a famous lawyer, stays with his widowed mother and physically disabled sister. He sends Jagan, a rich magnate's son and Lokaiya, two criminals to jail on the charge of rape and murder of an innocent girl. Jagan's father GMK uses his influence and starts creating trouble in Viswanath's life. GMK succeeds in getting Viswanath imprisoned on a trumped up charge. His heartbroken mother dies. Once out of jail, Viswanath sets out to punish the culprits when he temporarily loses his eyesight.

Cast 

Rajinikanth as Viswanath
Radha as Geetha
M. N. Nambiar as G.M.K
V.K.Ramasamy as Dhanakodi
Cho Ramaswamy as A. R. Chandran/Reddy
Senthamarai as Eshwaran
Sathyaraj as Jagan
Sangili Murugan as Doctor
Leo Prabu as Logu
K. Kannan as Ramesh
A. R. S. as  Saravanan's father
S. N. Lakshmi as Kalpana's mother
C. R. Vijayakumari as Viswanath's mother
Uma Bharani as Shanthi
Peeli Sivam as Gopinath
S. R. Veeraraghavan as Judge
K. Natraj as Henchman of G.M.K
Oru Viral Krishna Rao as Henchman of G.M.K
Ennatha Kannaiya as Assistant of A. R. Chandran
Pasi Narayanan as Chettiyar
LIC Narasimhan as Eye Doctor
Kullamani as Group dancer
Omakuchi Narasimhan as Group dancer
 Srilekha Rajendran

Production 
Rajinikanth initially wanted to star in a Tamil remake of the Hindi film Vishwanath (1978) with S. Ravi producing, but as Ravi did not like the film, they decided to collaborate on a different project, eventually choosing to remake the Kannada film Premada Kanike (1976) as Polladhavan (1980). Nonetheless, Vishwanath would still be remade in Tamil, with S. P. Muthuraman directing and Rajinikanth starring. The remake was originally titled Naan Gandhi Alla but, following a court order, was retitled Naan Mahaan Alla. As a result, the lead character's final dialogue was changed to match the new title, although the lip syncing to the original dialogue "Naan Gandhi Alla" was not changed.

Soundtrack 
The music was composed by Ilaiyaraaja and lyrics were written by Vaali.

References

External links 
 

1980s Tamil-language films
1984 action films
1984 films
Films directed by S. P. Muthuraman
Films scored by Ilaiyaraaja
Indian action films
Indian courtroom films
Tamil remakes of Hindi films